Tatyana Litovchenko (born 10 May 1978) is a Russian freestyle swimmer. She competed in two events at the 1996 Summer Olympics.

References

External links
 

1978 births
Living people
Russian female freestyle swimmers
Olympic swimmers of Russia
Swimmers at the 1996 Summer Olympics
Place of birth missing (living people)